The 1950 County Championship was the 51st officially organised running of the County Championship.

Lancashire and Surrey shared the Championship title.

Table
12 points for a win
6 points to each side in a match in which scores finish level
4 points for first innings lead in a lost or drawn match
2 points for tie on first innings in a lost or drawn match

Hampshire and Gloucestershire records include eight points each for win on first innings in match reduced by weather to one day. Hampshire v Kent at Southampton ended as a tie: Hampshire, gaining first innings lead, awarded eight points, Kent four. Worcestershire record includes two points for tie on first innings in match lost. In a damp summer, Glamorgan's record of nine matches where no decision could be made even on first innings is a record.

References

1950 in English cricket
County Championship seasons